Sekka Zusetsu is a figure collection written by Doi Toshitsura, the fourth daimyō of Koga Domain in 1832.

Overview 
Koga Domain was located at the center of the Kantō Plain. Due to heavy snowfall, the Koga Domain was a good place to observe snowflakes.

Doi Toshitsura, the fourth daimyō of Koga Domain started observing snowflakes as his hobby with his own microscope which was imported from the Netherlands, and he drew pictures and studies about snowflakes in the book. This figure collection of his is highly valued today in Japan as the first Japanese figure collection of snowflakes.

It's said that Toshitsura had many difficulties observing snowflake properly because snowflakes need −10 to −15 Celsius degrees temperature to hold their correct shapes. So Toshitsura had to observe them under very cold temperatures.

This book was written for him and his family (the Doi clan), but it had great influence on Japanese textile-patterns also. As soon as he wrote the book, snowflake patterns became popular among ordinary people in Edo.

Observation method 
Putting a black cloth outside at night when it seems cold enough to snow
Receiving snowflakes with the cloth
If snowflakes received, picking them up carefully and putting into a black cup
Being careful not to breathe on them, and observing them with a microscope.

External links
 Scanned facsimile of entire Sekka Zusetsu online

Edo-period works
19th-century history books